Omotunde E. G. Johnson (born 1941), is a senior research associate at the African Center for Economic Transformation. He previously worked as a consultant with the International Monetary Fund on central banking and financial sector issues.

Early life and education
Born in Freetown to Creole parents, Johnson was educated at the Sierra Leone Grammar School. He later emigrated to the United States in 1962 to further his studies. Johnson is an alumnus of UCLA were he obtained his bachelor's, master's and doctoral degrees between 1961 and 1970. All degrees are in economics.

Career
Johnson worked as a researcher and consultant with the IMF on a diverse range of issues related to countries in the Caribbean and Africa. He engaged in scholarly works and published extensively while at the 
African Center for Economic Transformation. Johnson also taught at the University of Sierra Leone and the University of Michigan. He is a Senior Associate Member at St Antony's College, University of Oxford .

Books authored 

 Johnson, Omotunde E. G.. Trade, Exchange Rate and Financial Policy Coordination in the. N.p., International Monetary Fund, 1986.
 Johnson, Omotunde E. G.. Financial Market Countraints and Private Investment in a Developing Country. N.p., International Monetary Fund, 1990.
 Johnson, Omotunde E. G.. Economic Analysis and the Structure of Land Rights in the Sierra Leone Provinces. United States, University Microfilms, 1980.
 Johnson, Omotunde E. G.. Financial Sector Development in African Countries: Major Policy Making Issues. Germany, Springer International Publishing, 2020.
 Johnson, Omotunde E. G.. Dancing with Trouble: A Novel on African Leadership. United States, Langdon Street Press, 2013.
 Johnson, Omotunde E. G.. Economic Diversification and Growth in Africa: Critical Policy Making Issues. Germany, Springer International Publishing, 2016.
 Johnson, Omotunde E. G. Economic Challenges and Policy Issues in Early Twenty-First-Century Sierra Leone. United Kingdom, London Publishing Partnership, 2012.

Selected publications

References

Sierra Leone Creole people
Sierra Leonean people of Liberated African descent
University of California, Los Angeles alumni
1941 births

Living people
Academic staff of Fourah Bay College
People from Freetown
University of Michigan faculty
Sierra Leonean economists